Playing Doctor is a 2014 German comedy film directed by Marco Petry.

Cast 
 Merlin Rose - Andi
 Lisa Vicari - Lilli
 Max von der Groeben - Harry 
 Jannis Niewöhner - Bobby
 Christiane Paul - Andi's Mother
 Oliver Korittke - Andi's Father Tom
  - Katja
  - Bea Zimmermann
  - Jaromir
  - Fußballtrainer

References

External links 

2014 comedy films
German comedy films
2010s German films
2010s German-language films